The Skyborg project is a United States Air Force Vanguard program developing unmanned combat aerial vehicles intended to accompany a manned fighter aircraft. , contracts have been awarded to Boeing, General Atomics, Kratos Unmanned Aerial Systems and Northrop Grumman.

Development 
On September 29, 2020, the US Air Force contracted nine corporations (AeroVironment, Autonodyne LLC, BAE Systems, Blue Force Technologies, Fregata Systems LLC, Lockheed Martin, NextGen Aeronautic, Sierra Technical Services, and Wichita State University) to work on Skyborg prototyping and experimentation. On December 21, 2020, Voly Defense Solutions LLC of Concord, California, was added to the contract.

See also
 Boeing MQ-28 Ghost Bat, formerly the Boeing Airpower Teaming System
 Kratos XQ-58 Valkyrie
 X-62A VISTA, formerly the NF-16D VISTA

References

Drone warfare